This is a list of New Zealand Academy Award winners and nominees.

Best Actor

Best Actress

Best Supporting Actress

Best Animated Short Film

Best Animated Film

Best Costume Design

Best Director

Best Documentary Feature Film

Best Film Editing

Best Makeup and Hairstyling

Best Original Song

Best Picture

Best Production Design

Best Short Film - Live Action

Best Sound Editing

Best Sound Mixing

Best Visual Effects

Best Writing – Adapted Screenplay

Best Writing – Original Screenplay

Nominations and Winners

References

Lists of Academy Award winners and nominees by nationality or region
Academy Awards